Chi soffre, speri (Let him who Suffers Hope) or L'Egisto is an opera in a prologue and three acts by the Italian composer Virgilio Mazzocchi, performed with an intermedio titled La fiera di Farfa with music by Marco Marazzoli.

It has been described as the "first comic opera". In fact the libretto, by Giulio Rospigliosi (the future Pope Clement IX), is based on Boccaccio and deals with a Christian-Neoplatonic allegory, regarding the relationships of Ozio (“Leisure”), Sentimento and Virtù (“Virtue”). During the intermezzi, which were composed by Marazzoli, commedia dell'arte characters (like "the Neapolitan Coviello, the Bergamasque Zanni, Moschino" etc.) are introduced into this 'serious' context. The use of the term "comedia musicale" in the printed score might go back to Dante's Divine Comedy (completed 1320), merely addressing a happy ending story.
 
The opera was first performed at the Palazzo Barberini, Rome on 12 February 1637. The surviving score is a revised version dating from 1639.

Roles

Synopsis
The impoverished Egisto is in love with the young widow Alvida. She rejects his advances unless he destroys the things dearest to him: a tower he has inherited and his favourite falcon. He does so and Alvida is so impressed by the strength of his love that she marries him. In the ruins of the tower they find buried treasure and a heliotrope which cures Alvida's desperately ill son. In a sub-plot, Lucinda, who is in love with Egisto, disguises herself as a man. She comes near to killing herself when Egisto rejects her but in the end it turns out that she is Egisto's long-lost sister.

References

Sources
Amanda Holden (ed.): The Viking Opera Guide. Viking, London 1993.
Del Teatro (in Italian)
Le magazine de l'opéra baroque
Roger Parker (ed.): The Oxford illustrated history of opera''. Oxford University Press, Oxford 1994.

Italian-language operas
Operas by Virgilio Mazzocchi
Operas by Marco Marazzoli
Operas
1637 operas